The Crew (French: L'équipage) is a 1928 French silent drama film directed by Maurice Tourneur and starring Jean Dax and Camille Bert.

The film's sets were designed by Robert-Jules Garnier.

Cast
 Claire de Lorez as Denise Maury
 Jean Dax as Capitaine Maury
 Georges Charlia as Lieutenant Herbillon
 Camille Bert as Berthier
 Pierre de Guingand as Thélis
 Daniel Mendaille as Deschamps  
 René Donnio as Mécanicien  
 Robert Astruc as Neuville  
 Charles Barrois as Marbot  
 Belleville 
 Robby Guichard as Georges  
 Mitchell as Le médecin 
 Henri Monteux as Mathieu  
 Thèvenet

References

Bibliography
 Waldman, Harry. Maurice Tourneur: The Life and Films. McFarland, 2001.

External links

1928 films
1920s war drama films
French war drama films
Films directed by Maurice Tourneur
French silent feature films
World War I aviation films
French black-and-white films
1928 drama films
Silent war drama films
1920s French films
1920s French-language films